Asha Kutty Nair, known by the stage name Revathi, is an Indian actress and film director, known for her works predominantly in Tamil and Malayalam cinema. She has won several accolades, including three National Film Awards in three different categories, and six Filmfare Awards South. Revathi is a trained Bharatanatyam dancer, having studied since the age of seven and performed her arangetram in Chennai in 1979. Apart from films, Revathi has been involved in a variety of social organisations, the most notable being the Banyan, Ability foundation, Tanker foundation and Vidyasagar, and has also served as a member of several film festivals including the Chennai International Film Festival and the International Film Festival of India.

National Film Awards

Cinema Express Awards

Filmfare Awards South

Kerala State Film Awards

Ananda Vikadan Film Awards

Screen Awards

South Indian International Movie Awards

Tamil Nadu State Film Awards

The Mylapore Academy Berkley Drama Award 
 1984 – Best Actress in Television for Penn
 1989 – Best Actress in Television for Iravil Oru Pagal

International Film Festival of India 
 2002 – Silver Peacock Jury Award for Mitr, My Friend

International Film Festival of Kerala 
 2009 – NETPAC Award for Best Malayalam Film for Kerala Cafe

Vijay Awards 
 2018 - Vijay Award for Best Supporting Actress for Pa Paandi

Screen Awards 
 2004 – Best Supporting Actress for Dhoop

Zee Cine Awards 
 2004 – Best Supporting Actress for Dhoop

JFW Award  
 2019 - Best actress in a comic role for her performance in Gulaebaghavali.
 2020 - Best actress in a comic role for her performance in Jackpot.

Other awards 

 1993 – Tamil Nadu Iyal Isai Nataka Manram: Kalaimamani
 2007 – Karmaveer Puraskaar: CMS Media Citizen

References

Revathi